At the Moscow Victory Parade of 24 June 1945, marking the defeat of Nazi Germany, there were a total of 200 captured German military standards and flags, majority being from the Wehrmacht. The standards were rectangular and swallowtailed, while flags were larger and square. Carried by a battalion of the Separate Operational Purpose Division of the NKVD, they were thrown to the steps of Lenin's Mausoleum under drumroll. Most standards were made in 1935. There was also the banner staff of the 1st SS Panzer Division Leibstandarte SS Adolf Hitler (LSSAH); its banner had been found separately and was not brought to the parade. The staff was carried in a prominent place on the right of the front rank of the first column of soldiers. It has been incorrectly called Hitler's personal standard.

The standards were selected from a pool of about 900 standards and banners shipped to Moscow from Berlin and Dresden. Some of them were collected by SMERSH trophy teams in May 1945 and some were taken from German museums (in 1944 Adolf Hitler ordered to move all military standards to museums, possibly to prevent their capture in battle). The LSSAH banner staff was captured in the Battle of Berlin.

After the parade additional color shots were made showing the flags of various Nazi organizations and other veteran organizations being thrown to the ground. The shots were added to the official video of the parade. The idea to have German standards at the parade and throw them to the ground was suggested by Soviet leader Joseph Stalin in May 1945. The show of contempt stemmed from the old custom of "disdain not for the enemy, but for his defied military colours" in the troops of Russian general Alexander Suvorov. 

The following list is based on the list of standards approved by Colonel Peredelsky on 21 June 1945. It is divided into battalion, Abteilung and regimental standards and flags (although during the war the Soviets captured standards of larger German units, such as XLVII Panzer Corps). Peredelsky's list includes older Imperial German standards and Nazi police flags. The banner staff of LSSAH was approved separately from the list. Most standards are now housed in the Central Armed Forces Museum of Moscow, some are kept in museums of other countries.

Battalion flags and standards

Abteilung standards

Regimental standards

LSSAH banner staff

Notes

References

See also
 List of Soviet military units that lost their standards in World War II

1945-related lists
Nazi-related lists
War trophies
standards at the Moscow Victory Parade of 1945
Russian and Soviet military-related lists
Military insignia
Moscow Victory Day Parade of 1945